Kauko Heikkinen (born 3 March 1938) is a Finnish gymnast. He competed at the 1960 Summer Olympics and the 1964 Summer Olympics.

References

External links
 

1938 births
Living people
Finnish male artistic gymnasts
Olympic gymnasts of Finland
Gymnasts at the 1960 Summer Olympics
Gymnasts at the 1964 Summer Olympics
People from Lieksa
Sportspeople from North Karelia
20th-century Finnish people